The 18 kilometre Cross-country skiing event was part of the cross-c skiing programme at the 1952 Winter Olympics. It was the sixth appearance of the event. The competition was held on Monday, 18 February 1952. Eighty cross-country skiers from 18 nations competed.

Medalists

Results

References

External links
Official Olympic Report
 

Men's cross-country skiing at the 1952 Winter Olympics
Men's 18 kilometre cross-country skiing at the Winter Olympics